José Vila (19 August 1926 – March 2001) was a Spanish alpine skier. He competed in two events at the 1948 Winter Olympics.

References

External links
 

1926 births
2001 deaths
Spanish male alpine skiers
Olympic alpine skiers of Spain
Alpine skiers at the 1948 Winter Olympics
Sportspeople from Barcelona
20th-century Spanish people